Joseph Raymond Doherty, Lord Doherty,  (born 30 January 1958) is a Scottish lawyer and Senator of the College of Justice, a judge of the Supreme Courts of Scotland.

Early life
Doherty studied at the School of Law of the University of Edinburgh (LLB), Hertford College, Oxford (BCL) and Harvard University (LLM). He was admitted to the Faculty of Advocates in 1984.

Legal career
In 1990, he was elected Clerk of the Faculty, holding that office until 1995. He served as Standing Junior Counsel (legal advisor) to the Ministry of Defence from 1990 to 1991 and to the Industry Department of the Scottish Office from 1991 to 1997, at which time he was appointed Queen's Counsel. From 1998 to 2001, he was an Advocate Depute.

The Bench
In April 2010, he was appointed a Senator of the College of Justice, a judge of the Court of Session and High Court of Justiciary, the Supreme Courts of Scotland, taking the judicial title, Lord Doherty. He heard the case brought by a number of Scottish politicians, including Andy Wightman and Joanna Cherry, which sought an answer to the question on whethear the United Kingdom could unilaterally withdraw its notice of its intention to leave the European Union. Lord Doherty refused permission for judicial review, but this decision was overturned by the Inner House of the Court of Session. 

It was announced on 17 February 2020 that Lord Doherty had been appointed to the Inner House of the Court of Session with effect from December 2020.. He was appointed to Her Majesty's Privy Council on 12 April 2022 allowing him the honorific The Right Honourable.

References

1958 births
Living people
Members of the Faculty of Advocates
Doherty
Alumni of the University of Edinburgh
Alumni of Hertford College, Oxford
Harvard Law School alumni
20th-century King's Counsel
Scottish King's Counsel
Members of the Privy Council of the United Kingdom